The first season of Power Couple premiered on Tuesday, April 12, 2016 at 10:30 p.m. on RecordTV.

The show features eight celebrity couples living under one roof and facing extreme challenges that will test how well they really know each other. Each week, a couple will be eliminated until the last couple wins the grand prize.

Laura Keller & Jorge Sousa won the competition with 82.40% of the public vote over Simony & Patrick Souza and took home the R$697.000 prize they accumulated during the show. Simony & Patrick received a brand new car as the runners-up.

After beating Laura & Jorge in a face-off challenge during the live final, Simony & Patrick had the opportunity to reward an eliminated couple with R$20.000. They choose Gretchen & Carlos. Gretchen was also revealed to be Brazil's favorite contestant after winning the real time fan vote through Twitter, receiving another R$20.000, bringing her cash winnings to R$40.000.

Cast

Couples

Future appearances
In 2017, Conrado (from Andréia & Conrado) appeared in A Fazenda 9, he finished in 11th place.

In 2018, Popó (from Emilene & Popó) appeared in Dancing Brasil 3, he finished in 14th place.

In 2019, Túlio Maravilha (from Cristiane & Túlio) and Jorge Sousa (from Laura & Jorge) appeared in A Fazenda 11. Túlio finished in 14th place, and Jorge finished in 12th place.

In 2021, Laura Keller (from Laura & Jorge) appeared in Ilha Record 1, she finished in 3rd place in the competition.

In 2022, Gretchen (from Gretchen & Carlos) appeared as a Rose in The Masked Singer Brasil 2, she joined Group A and sang only one song before her unmasking at the first episode, placing last at 16th in the competition.

The game
Key

Challenges' results

Notes

:  The final Couples' challenge (which would award the winner R$50.000 instead of R$20.000) losing couple would be automatically eliminated. Gian & Tati quit the endurance challenge first and were eliminated. Laura & Jorge quit second, leaving Simony & Patrick as the winners.

Voting history

Notes

: At the end of week 1's couples' save vote, Gian & Tati and Popó & Emilene were tied with 3 votes each. Per the rules, since Gian & Tati have the most money in their overall Bank account, they were saved from elimination, while Popó & Emilene ended up being eliminated.
: For the final, the public votes for the couple they want to win Power Couple Brasil 1.

Ratings and reception

Brazilian ratings

All numbers are in points and provided by Kantar Ibope Media.

 In 2016, each point represents 69.417 households in São Paulo.

References

External links 

 Power Couple 1 on R7.com

2016 Brazilian television seasons
Power Couple (Brazilian TV series)